The Lord Mayor's Cup is a Brisbane Racing Club Group 3 Thoroughbred horse race for horses three years old and older, run under Weight for Age conditions over a distance of 1600 metres at Eagle Farm Racecourse, Brisbane, Australia  during the Queensland Winter Racing Carnival. Total prizemoney is A$140,000.

History
The first time the race was run as the Labour Day Cup was on 7 May 1956 as a 10 furlong event on a seven race meeting at Doomben and was held on Labour Day which at the time was the first Monday in May. The race was upgraded to a Listed race in 1979. The race continued to be held on Labour Day until 2003 when it was rescheduled for late April with the name change to Doomben Carnival Cup. In 2005 the race was set to the current name Lord Mayor's Cup and since 2006 the race is on the Doomben Cup racecard. 
The race has had several changes in the running distance.

Name

 1956–1985 - Labour Day Cup
 1986 - Seven National News Handicap
 1987–1989 - Carnival Handicap
 1990–2002 - Labour Day Cup
 2003–2004 - Doomben Carnival Cup
 2005 onwards - Lord Mayor's Cup

Grade

1979–1999 - Listed Race
2000 onwards - Group 3

Distance

1956–1972 -  miles (~2000 metres)
1973–1985 – 2200 metres  
1986–1987 – 2020 metres
1988 – 2026 metres 
1989 – 2031 metres 
1990 – 2037 metres 
1991 – 2025 metres 
1992 – 2045 metres
1993 – 2043 metres  
1994 – 2046 metres 
1995 – 2037 metres 
1998 – 2030 metres  
 1999–2004 – 2040 metres
 2005 – 2020 metres
 2006–2011 – 1615 metres
 2012–2013 – 1600 metres
 2014 – 1615 metres
 2015 – 1600 metres
 2016 – 1615 metres
 2017 – 1600 metres
 2018 – 1630 metres 
 2019 – 1600 metres

Venue

Prior to 2016 - Doomben Racecourse
2017 - Eagle Farm Racecourse
2018 - Doomben Racecourse
2019 - Eagle Farm Racecourse

Winners

 2022 - Bigboyroy
 2021 - Reloaded
 2020 - Gaulois
 2019 - Order Again
2018 - Duca Valentinois
2017 - Col 'N' Lil
2016 - Mighty Lucky
2015 - Strawberry Boy
2014 - Angel Of Mercy
2013 - Solzhenitsyn
2012 - Solzhenitsyn
2011 - Firebolt
2010 - Rothesay
2009 - Rampant Lion
2008 - Rum Dum
2007 - Headturner
2006 - Cog Hill
2005 - Tickle
2004 - This Manshood
2003 - Restless
2002 - Freemason
2001 - Sky Heights
2000 - Integrate
1999 - Joss Sticks
1998 - Only A Lady
1997 - race not held
1996 - race not held
1995 - Arborea
1994 - Tusk Hunter
1993 - Coolong Road
1992 - Cool Credit
1991 - Comrade
1990 - Red Chiffon
1989 - Cav Lon
1988 - Miss Stephenson
1987 - Stars Are Easy
1986 - Just Now
1985 - Our Compromise
1984 - Concord Stage
1983 - †race not held
1982 - Keep Safe
1981 - Sovereign Khan  
1980 - Our Cavalier
1979 - Pay The Purple
1978 - Miner's Inn 
1977 - Rhalif
1976 - Our Cavalier 
1975 - Zasu 
1974 - El Karpe
1973 - All Fashion
1972 - Buon Giorno 
1971 - Gunsynd
1970 - Cachondeo 
1969 - Earlmark 
1968 - Snatchem 
1967 - Pavement 
1966 - Voir Tout 
1965 - New Zealand 
1964 - Flash Hero 
1963 - Emperor's Flight  
1962 - Brother Mac
1961 - Near Light
1960 - Drumcondra 
1959 - Murray Grand 
1958 - Book Link 
1957 - Ermis 
1956 - Cool Gent 

† Race meeting was abandoned due to rain.

See also
 List of Australian Group races
 Group races

References

Horse races in Australia
Open middle distance horse races
Sport in Brisbane